Marc Møller (born 7 June 1986) is a retired Danish professional football defender.

External links
Lyngby BK profile
Official Danish Superliga statistics

1986 births
Living people
Danish men's footballers
FC Midtjylland players
Lyngby Boldklub players
Danish Superliga players
Ikast FS players

Association football defenders